Christopher James O'Grady (born 25 January 1986) is an English footballer striker who plays for Grantham Town.

O'Grady notably played professionally for Leicester City, Rotherham United, Oldham Athletic, Rochdale, Sheffield Wednesday, Barnsley, Brighton & Hove Albion, Chesterfield and Bolton Wanderers. He has also spent time on loan with Notts County, Rushden & Diamonds, Bury, Bradford City, Stockport County, Sheffield United,  Nottingham Forest and Burton Albion.

Club career

Leicester City
Born in Nottingham, Nottinghamshire, O'Grady originally caught the eye of former Leicester City boss Micky Adams as he was prolific in front of goal for the under 18s and reserves. O'Grady was handed his debut when coming off the bench in Leicester's 2–0 victory over Grimsby Town in April 2003, but failed to break through into the first team the following season.

He made 11 appearances during a loan spell at Notts County in late 2004, gaining some much needed league experience, and ended the 2004–05 campaign on a high, winning a place on the bench in City's final game of the season against Plymouth Argyle.

After scoring from the penalty spot against Inter Milan in pre-season, O'Grady had a successful spell on loan at Rushden & Diamonds at the end of 2005, before returning to Leicester to compete for a place in the first team line-up. He grabbed his first Championship goal at Luton Town in March 2006, a late strike which earned City a 2–1 away win.

In his first start for Leicester City, he scored the first goal in a 2–0 win over Macclesfield Town in the League Cup first round. His second start saw Leicester win 1–0 at home to Southend United.

Rotherham United
On 18 January 2007, O'Grady signed for Rotherham United on a two-and-a-half-year deal for £65,000. His first goal for Rotherham was a penalty against Huddersfield Town in February 2007. O'Grady altogether scored four goals in his first season with Rotherham.

Oldham Athletic
O'Grady transferred to Oldham Athletic for an undisclosed fee on 28 May 2008, making his debut in the following season on 9 August in a 4–3 win over Millwall. After ten appearances for the Latics without a goal, he was loaned out to Bury.

O'Grady signed on loan for Bradford City on 2 January 2009 on a month's loan. His debut for Bradford came the following day when he was a second-half substitute for Michael Boulding in a 0–0 draw with Shrewsbury Town. O'Grady played just two games with Bradford, before he returned to Oldham and immediately joining another League One side Stockport County on loan until the end of the 2008–09 season. His debut for the Hatters came on 4 February, coming on at half-time in a 1–0 loss to Milton Keynes Dons. O'Grady's first goal for Stockport was in his seventh game to give the side a 1–1 draw with Leicester City on 3 March 2009.

Rochdale
O'Grady signed for Rochdale on loan on 21 August 2009 and impressed, scoring 12 league goals in 21 games. On 14 January 2010 O'Grady signed a two-and-a-half-year contract with Rochdale for an undisclosed fee.

On 23 January 2010 he scored his first hat-trick, against Cheltenham. In the same season he helped Rochdale gain promotion from League Two.

Sheffield Wednesday

On 14 July 2011 Rochdale confirmed that a bid by Sheffield Wednesday for O'Grady had been rejected. On 9 August 2011 Wednesday confirmed the signing of O'Grady from Rochdale for an undisclosed fee, believed to be around £350,000, with the striker putting pen to paper on a three-year contract at Hillsborough. Chris scored his first goal for the Owls in a 2–2 draw against fierce rivals Sheffield United. His next goal came away at Morecambe in the FA Cup. His third, a spectacular headed lob, came against local rivals and promotion candidates Huddersfield Town. He was considered the work horse of the Wednesday frontline by many an Owls fan. Despite having not scored many goals for the club, he
cemented himself as first-choice forward alongside Gary Madine. O'Grady also formed a solid partnership with fellow frontman Ryan Lowe, when Madine was either suspended or out injured.

On 26 February 2012, O'Grady scored once again against derby rivals Sheffield United with a header from a Lewis Buxton cross in a 1–0 win for the Owls at Hillsborough.

At the start of the 2012–13 season, O'Grady scored three goals in two games, the first two against one of his previous clubs Oldham Athletic in the League Cup, and then, in the first league game, he scored a stunner against Derby County. He received the ball from Lewis Buxton, turned and smashed a shot with his left foot into the top left corner.

Loan at Barnsley

On January transfer deadline day in 2013, O'Grady joined Wednesday's South Yorkshire rivals Barnsley on loan for the remainder of the season.

Barnsley
After a successful loan spell at Barnsley, O'Grady joined them on a permanent basis on 19 June 2013 from Sheffield Wednesday on a two-year contract for an undisclosed fee, rumoured to be around £300,000.

Brighton & Hove Albion
Following Barnsley's relegation from the Championship at the end of the 2013–14 season, O'Grady transferred to Brighton & Hove Albion on 18 July 2014, signing a three-year contract for an undisclosed six figure fee believed to be £500,000. He scored his first goal for Brighton in an FA Cup tie against Brentford 3 January 2015.

Loan spells
On 27 November 2014 O'Grady went on loan to Sheffield United until the end of January 2015. He scored once for Sheffield United; his goal coming in a 1–1 draw with Walsall. On 29 December, Brighton & Hove recalled O'Grady from his loan spell at United due to a striker shortage.

On 1 September 2015, O'Grady joined Nottingham Forest on loan for the remainder of the season.

O'Grady joined Burton Albion in July 2016 on loan for the 2016–17 season. He scored his first goal for Burton in a 2–1 win over former club Rotherham United on 29 December 2016.

Chesterfield
In June 2017, O'Grady signed a two-year contract with EFL League Two side Chesterfield. Upon signing O'Grady told the club website, "It's the type of club and the type of project that is just perfect for me. The objective is to get the club back to where it belongs - in League One...I had other offers but Chesterfield were the first to come in for me and it just felt right."
At the end of Chesterfield's dismal league 2 campaign in 2017/18, O'Grady was ironically voted player of the season by disgruntled fans before the club decided to not award the 'honour' at all.

Oldham Athletic
On 30 July 2018, O'Grady rejoined League Two club Oldham Athletic on a one-year deal.

Bolton Wanderers
On 2 September 2019, O'Grady signed a contract until the end of the season with League One side Bolton Wanderers, following the termination of his contract at Oldham Athletic. Due to injury, his debut didn't come until 19 October, when he came on as a late substitute in a 1–3 defeat against Rochdale with his first start coming three days later, when he played the full 90 minutes in Bolton's first win of the season, a 2–0 away win against Bristol Rovers. His first goals came on 29 October when he scored twice in a 3–1 win against Manchester City U21 in the EFL Trophy, with his first league goal coming in Bolton's next match, as he opened the scoring against Fleetwood Town, Bolton winning 2–1, their third win in a row. On 26 June it was announced O'Grady would be one of 14 senior players released at the end of his contract on 30 June.

Ilkeston Town
On 24 May 2022, he signed for Ilkeston Town.

Grantham Town
On 11 February 2023, he joined Grantham Town.

International career
O'Grady was capped by England at youth international level.

Career statistics

Notes

Honours
Rochdale
Football League Two promotion: 2009–10

Sheffield Wednesday
Football League One promotion: 2011–12

References

External links

1986 births
Living people
Footballers from Nottingham
English footballers
England youth international footballers
Association football forwards
Leicester City F.C. players
Notts County F.C. players
Rushden & Diamonds F.C. players
Rotherham United F.C. players
Oldham Athletic A.F.C. players
Bury F.C. players
Bradford City A.F.C. players
Stockport County F.C. players
Rochdale A.F.C. players
Sheffield Wednesday F.C. players
Sheffield United F.C. players
English Football League players
National League (English football) players
Barnsley F.C. players
Brighton & Hove Albion F.C. players
Nottingham Forest F.C. players
Burton Albion F.C. players
Chesterfield F.C. players
Bolton Wanderers F.C. players
Ilkeston Town F.C. players
Grantham Town F.C. players